The 12917 / 12918 Gujarat Sampark Kranti Express is one of the Sampark Kranti Expresses, a train on India's broad-gauge network, connecting Ahmedabad (code: ADI) and Delhi  (code: NZM), a distance of approximately 1085 km. The train runs on Indian Railways broad-gauge track network and was introduced in 2008 to provide quicker connectivity from India's capital New Delhi to locations in Gujarat.

Schedule

The Gujarat Sampark Kranti Express runs three days a week. As of 1 November 2009, 2917 departs ADI every Monday, Wednesday and Friday at 1720 and arrives at NZM at 1040 on Tuesday, Thursday and Saturday, averaging 65 km/h speed during its run. 2918 departs NZM every Tuesday, Thursday and Saturday at 1355 and arrives at ADI at 610 on Wednesday, Friday and Sunday, averaging 69 km/h speed. In its journey, the train passes through the Indian states of Gujarat, Madhya Pradesh, Rajasthan, Uttar Pradesh, Haryana and Delhi. Some cities where the Gujarat Sampark Kranti Express halts en route are Nadiad, Chhayapuri (Vadodara), Godhra, Dahod, Ratlam, Kota and Mathura. The entire route of the train is on double-line electrified track section of Indian Railways.

Route & Halts

 
 
 
 

Coaches & rake
The train's rake is split into at least three classes of reserved travel: AC 2 Tier (code: A/2A), AC 3 Tier (code:B/3A) and non air-conditioned reserved sleeper (SL). As it is a Sampark Kranti train, between 2 and 6 carriages requiring no previous travel reservation (code: General) are included. Along with Maharashtra Sampark Kranti and West Bengal Sampark Kranti, this train now runs LHB coach. These three trains are the only Sampark Kranti Expresses to have LHB coach.

Rake sharing
The train shares its rake with 20945/20946 Kevadiya–Hazrat Nizamuddin Gujarat Sampark Kranti Express.

Traction
Both trains are hauled by a Vadodara Loco Shed-based WAP-7 (HOG)-equipped locomotive on its entire journey.

Other details 
The passenger fare between ADI and NZM varies from INR (Indian rupee) 1400 (A/2A) to INR 190 (General). Though its route is 150 km longer than the Ashram Express, the Gujarat Sampark Kranti averages a higher speed and takes 15 minutes less than the Ashram Express to travel from Delhi to Ahmedabad. This is attributable to the fact that the Samprak Kranti Express gets the benefit of electric traction, double-line track and almost no stops outside Gujarat on its entire route. Gujarat Sampark Kranti Express is designated as a Superfast train, which denotes that it gets priority over local (commuter) trains, standard express and passenger trains and most freight trains.

See also 
Indian Railways

References

Transport in Ahmedabad
Transport in Delhi
Railway services introduced in 2005
Sampark Kranti Express trains
Rail transport in Gujarat
Rail transport in Rajasthan
Rail transport in Uttar Pradesh
Rail transport in Madhya Pradesh
Rail transport in Delhi